People Gonna Talk is the third album by English singer-songwriter James Hunter, released on March 7, 2006. The album charted at number one on the Billboard Top Blues Albums chart. The album reached the top ten in Mojo magazine's Albums Of 2006 critics polls. It was also nominated for the Grammy Award for Best Traditional Blues Album of the Year. Two singles were released from the album in the U.S., "People Gonna Talk" and "Mollena".

Track listing
All songs written by James Hunter.
 "People Gonna Talk" – 3:18
 "No Smoke Without Fire" – 3:05
 "You Can't Win" – 2:31
 "Riot in My Heart" – 4:16
 "'Till Your Fool Comes Home" – 2:30
 "Mollena" -2:33
 "I'll Walk Away" – 4:07
 "Watch & Chain" – 3:19
 "Kick It Around" – 1:59
 "Don't Come Back" – 2:37
 "It's Easy to Say" – 3:48
 "Tell Her For Me" – 1:53
 "Talking 'Bout My Love" – 2:22
 "All Through Cryin'" – 2:35

Personnel
James Hunter – guitar, vocals
Lee Badau – baritone saxophone
Damian Hand – tenor saxophone, string arrangements
Jonathan Lee – percussion, drums
Vicky Matthews – organ
Tom Morgan – piano
Gavin Whitlock – baritone saxophone

Guest musicians
Ellen Blair – viola
Gill Morley – violin
Carwyn Ellis – organ

Production
Liam Watson – Producer, engineer, Mixing
Harry Benson – Photography
Noel Summerville – Mastering

Notes

External links
Rolling Stone Review

2006 albums
Rounder Records albums
Albums produced by Liam Watson (record producer)